LexSite is a suit of dictionaries developed for translators, engineers, teachers, researchers and students who might need cross-language communications in the English-Russian language pair.

Developed to improve cross-cultural communications, the dictionary contains more than 1.4 million lexical-semantic units. Its search engine captures morphological specifics of the English and Russian languages thus reducing ambiguities and improving the speed and quality of translations in the English-Russian language pair.

Free access to the dictionary reflects the commitment of the Language Interface team to streamline communications between speakers of English and Russian languages.

The development work included the creation of lexical dataset free from numerous errors frequently found in other tools. This is where LexSite excels in providing an outstanding quality of information.

In addition to commonly used vocabulary, LexSite contains a unique terminology base. It includes terminology related to science and technology, as well as project-specific terminology used in international projects. These terms were collected by the Language Interface team while working with organizations such as United Nations, Lokheed-Martin, Worley-Parsons, NASA, Orbital, Fluor Daniel, McKinsey, Sberbank, Tengizchevroil, Schlumberger and other global brands.

LexSite platform is developed and managed at Language Interface, a language engineering company that has been providing linguistic support for international projects for more than 20 years. The first version of this dictionary was published online in 2009. The current version 5.0 features upgraded software framework and data structures. Its lexical base was considerably reworked and extended.

The decades of experience by the Language Interface team in English-Russian and Russian-English translation enabled the developers to identify specific problems faced by translators when working with this language pair and develop a tool to guide them in selecting words or phrases that offer the best possible fit for a given context.

LexSite continuous improvement involves research in the field of lexicography, cognitive linguistics and data science.
== Specification ==
Lexical database with more than 1.4 million Russian and English terms and phrases
Free access
Returns 90% of the database queries within 385 ms when receiving 10 queries per second for 30 seconds.
Captures morphological specifics of the English and Russian languages
Detects homoforms
Offers reverse translations without leaving the results of direct translation
Detects words entered in non-basic form

Advantages and disadvantages 
LexSite is focused on a single language pair, this may not be sufficient for tasks where a content needs to be translated into multiple languages. On the other hand, this narrow focus enables developers and linguists to achieve results in translation and language engineering that would not be possible otherwise.

See also 
Bilingual dictionary
Translation memory

External links 
LexSite Website
Language Interface

References 

 Mark Kit, Elena Berg. Sense Ranking in Dual-Language Online Dictionaries. The 10th International Conference ICT for Language Learning. Conference Proceeding: November, 7-9. Florence, Italy: Libreria Universitaria, 2017.
 Elena Berg, Mark Kit. Cognitive Approach to The Compilation of Test Materials for The Evaluation of Translator’s Skills. Cognitive Studies / Ètudes Cognitives. – Warsaw: Institute of Slavic Studies of the Polish Academy of Sciences, 2016. – P. 100-106.
 Mark Kit, Elena Berg. Online Bilingual Dictionary as a Learning Tool: Today and Tomorrow. The 9th International Conference ICT for Language Learning. Conference Proceedings: November, 17-18. Florence, Italy: Libreria Universitaria, 2016.
 Елена Берг, Марк Кит. Формирование контрольных материалов для оценки когнитивной способности переводчика. Науковий часопис Нацiонального педагогiчного унiверситету iм.М.П. Драгоманова. – Сер.9, Вип.13. Киiв: НПУ iм. М.П. Драгоманова, 2015– С.14-21.
 Mark Kit, Elena Berg. Lexical need as a Two-way Reality Cognition Tool. Cognitive Studies / Ètudes Cognitives 14, SOW Publishing House, Warsaw 2014.
 Mark Kit, Violetta Koseska-Toszewa. Dialog Between a Lexicographer and a Translator. Cognitive Studies / Ètudes Cognitives 13, SOW Publishing House, Warsaw 2013. P.13-23.
 Kit M., Kit D. On Development of “Smart” Dictionaries. Cognitive Studies / Ètudes Cognitives 12, SOW Publishing House, Warsaw 2012.

English bilingual dictionaries
Online databases
Russian dictionaries
Online dictionaries
Lexicography